India First is an English-language news weekly published from Bhubaneswar, Odisha.  The news weekly was launched in 2004 by journalists Sourav Mishra, Satya Nayak, Shubhanker Behera promoted by business person Sanjay Hans. Entrepreneurial English Publications Mishra, Nayak and Behera left the venture within a year after a successful launch.

References

External links
  dharitri.com
 scribd.com
 thesamaja.com

Weekly newspapers published in India
Publications established in 2004
Newspapers published in Bhubaneswar
English-language newspapers published in India
2004 establishments in Orissa